The Band of the City of New York Police Department, commonly known as the NYPD Police Band, is an American Police band which serves under the NYPD in New York City. The band currently has 70 members and is part of the NYPD Ceremonial Unit. The band's motto is as follows: Serve, Protect and Entertain. The NYPD Band performs at department ceremonies, parades and community events across the city and in concerts around the world.

History
The band was founded in 1991, when the NYPD decided that it needed a ceremonial unit to provide musical accompaniment. It was originally founded with 12 members. The band had originally existed from 1901 to 1955 in order for the NYPD to be represented during official functions of the city.

Ensembles

Marching Band
The marching band is the premier ensemble of the NYPD Band. It is an annual participant in the Columbus Day parade and the Macy's Thanksgiving Day Parade. It also performed at events such as the National Police Parade. It also took part in events such as the 2011 edition of the Quebec City International Festival of Military Bands, which included a performance of God Bless America with the Alexandrov Ensemble of the Russian military. In May 2018, the band jointly performed with the Alexandria Ceremonial Police Orchestra from Israeli film The Band's Visit.

Percussion Ensemble
The Percussion Ensemble, commonly known as the drumline consists of many different percussion instruments, including field snare drums, bass drums, cymbals, tenor drums, as well as alternative percussion instruments such as timbales, and shakers.

Jazz Ensemble
The Jazz Ensemble is composed of 18 members from the band. It was formed in 2005 as a subset of the marching band. It gives Jazz and Pop performances.

Steel Drum Ensemble
The Steel Drum Ensemble was formed in 2004 and performs during the Brooklyn West Indian American Day Parade and Bronx Caribbean Day Parade.

Longtime bandleader
Lieutenant Tony Giorgio was the founder and is the current director of the band. Giorgio is a graduate of C.W. Post (now the LIU Post) and has had training from musicians like Charlie Perry, Jack DeJohnette and Ron Gould. He is also a graduate of the FBI National Academy in Quantico, Virginia. He has been a member of the New York City Police Department since 1983. He was promoted to Sergeant in 1988 and Lieutenant in 1997. In 1996, Giorgio was awarded the New York City Police Foundation's Hemmerdinger award for excellence and outstanding contributions to Police Services in New York City. Giorgio retired in July 2019.

Main repertoire
The band's main repertoire includes, but is not limited to:

 Amazing Grace 
 Armed Forces Medley
 America the Beautiful Bad Boys
 Christmas Medley 
 Fanfare for the Common Man
 Mission Impossible 
 Notre Dame Victory March 
 On Broadway 
 Star Spangled Banner 
 The Navy Hymn 
 The Stars and Stripes Forever
 This is My Country

See also 
 NYPD Pipes and Drums
 Milwaukee Police Band
 Ceremonial Band of the Waterloo Regional Police
 Garda Band

References

External links
 Official Website of the NYPD
 Official Website of the NYPD Band
 Youtube: The NYPD Police Band at the New York City Saint Patrick's Day Parade
 Youtube: NYPD Band - Serve, Protect and Entertain
 "Ambassadors of music": NYPD mourns Alexandrov Ensemble deaths in fatal TU-154 crash

Musical groups established in 1901
Musical groups established in 1991
American police bands
New York City Police Department
1901 establishments in New York City
1991 establishments in New York City
Musical groups from New York City